Moritz Kuhn (born 1 August 1991) is a German footballer who plays for TSG Balingen.

References

External links
 

1991 births
Living people
German footballers
Association football midfielders
VfB Stuttgart II players
SG Sonnenhof Großaspach players
SV Sandhausen players
VfL Kirchheim/Teck players
SV Wehen Wiesbaden players
Türkgücü München players
TSG Balingen players
2. Bundesliga players
3. Liga players
Regionalliga players
Oberliga (football) players